In the 1952–53 Indiana State Sycamores men's basketball season, the Sycamores were led by coach John Longfellow, NAIB All-American Dick Atha and All-Indiana Collegiate Conference players Roger Adkins, Cliff Murray and Sam Richardson. They participated in their 8th NAIA Tourney. The Sycamores finished as the National Third Place team, with their victory over East Texas State and finished with a record of 23–8.  This season represented Indiana State's 5th NAIA Final Four and its 1st National Third Place finish.

Regular season
During the 1952–53 season, Indiana State finished the regular season to finish 17–7, 6–4 in the Indiana Collegiate Conference; they won by an average of 14 points per game, and set a new school scoring record, (2,321 points).  They broke the 100-point mark twice; scoring 106 points (vs. Kansas Wesleyan in the Midwest Tournament) and 101 vs. Manchester (IN) They averaged 89 points a game WITHOUT the 3-point shot!  They finished the season at 23-8; the fourth highest win total in school history to that point.

Coach John Longfellow's fifth team raced out of the gate, opening the season with 8 consecutive wins.  They began conference play with a record of 8-1, the sole loss coming in the mid-season Mid-Western Tournament to Indiana Central.  They placed 2nd in the Indiana Collegiate Conference title race and won the NAIA District 21 tourney, qualifying for the NAIA National Tournament.

Post-season
In 1953, Longfellow's fifth basketball team finished second in the Indiana Collegiate Conference title, won the NAIA District 21 title and received an invitation to the National Association of Intercollegiate Basketball (NAIB) National Tournament in Kansas City; this was Longfellow's fourth trip to the National Tournament and the eighth for Indiana State.  In Kansas City, the stormed into the National Quarterfinals winning their first three games by an average 26 points, scoring 100 or more in each game; they dropped a game to defending champion Southwest Missouri State but rallied for a win over East Texas State to finish 3rd Nationally.  Southwest Missouri State would successfully defend their 1952 title; becoming the second time to win consecutive titles.

Dick Atha received several honors at the end of regular season. He was selected to the NAIA All-American team, the Helms Foundation All-American team and was named 1st team All-Indiana Collegiate Conference.  Joining him on the all-conference team was Roger Adkins.

Roster
The Sycamores were led by All-American Atha and Roger Adkins' with 14.9 averages. They were followed by Jim Crockom's 12.7 average. The starting lineup featured two future 1,000 career point scorers; Atha and Richardson.  The roster also included a future well-known basketball coach in Indiana high circles, Basil Sfreddo - as the 6th man, Sfreddo would go on to coach the legendary George McGinnis at Indianapolis' George Washington High.  Austin "Pete" Pritchett would go on to statewide fame as a girls high school coach, winning 2 IHSAA State Titles and was inducted into the Indiana Basketball Hall of Fame.

Coaches
 Head coach John Longfellow - NAIA Champion and Hall of Fame coach
 Assistant coach - Paul Stemm

Schedule and results

|-
!colspan=8 style=| Regular Season
|-

Awards and honors
Dick Atha - Consensus NAIA All-American teams
Dick Atha – 1953 NAIA All-Tournament Team

References 

Indiana State Sycamores men's basketball seasons
Indiana State Sycamores men's basketball
Indiana State Sycamores men's basketball
Indiana State Sycamores